Pompano Beach Airpark  is a public airport located one mile (1.6 km) northeast of the central business district of Pompano Beach, in Broward County, Florida, United States. This airport is publicly owned by the City of Pompano Beach.

This airport is assigned a three-letter location identifier of PMP by the Federal Aviation Administration, but the International Air Transport Association (IATA) airport code is PPM (the IATA assigned PMP to Pimaga in Papua New Guinea). The International Civil Aviation Organization (ICAO) airport code is KPMP.

History

Pompano Beach Airport was constructed during World War II as an Naval outlying landing field (NOLF) for Naval Air Station Fort Lauderdale, what is now the Fort Lauderdale-Hollywood International Airport. On August 29, 1947, the City of Pompano Beach obtained the Airport under the Surplus Property Act of 1944 and renamed it Pompano Beach Air Park, due to its intent to limit the airport's usage to general aviation.

On August 5, 1958,  of air park property were released to the Broward County School Board for the construction of Pompano Beach Elementary School. The County received 9 more acres on September 18, 1967. On March 8, 1958, the City sold , located in the northeast corner of the air park property, for development of the Pompano Square Mall. The final transfer of air park property occurred in 1981 when  in the southwestern section of the air park property were purchased by the Pompano Elks Club. These transfers account for the current total  of the air park.

Pompano Beach Air Park is owned by the City of Pompano Beach. The air park is a Surplus Property Act airport. The Surplus Property Act of 1944 states that any lands conveyed under the act must be used for aviation purposes or ownership reverts to the FAA. The FAA can, however, release excess portions of the property for non-aviation purposes, and any proceeds from the sale of excess property must be used to support airport growth and development under the stipulations of the Surplus Property Act.

Facilities and aircraft

 Runway 6/24: , surface: asphalt
 Runway 10/28: , surface: asphalt
 Runway 15/33: , surface: asphalt

The airport also has an operational air traffic control tower under the FAA Contract Tower Program.

For 12-month period ending May 26, 2017 the airport had 169,722 aircraft operations, an average of 465 per day: 99.9% general aviation (169,506), <1% air taxi (136) and <1% military (80). There were at the time 131 aircraft based at this airport: 71% single engine (125), 17% multi engine (12), 4% jet aircraft (4) and 8% helicopter (17).

The Goodyear Blimp Spirit of Innovation is based out of Pompano Beach Airpark.

Fixed-base operators
 Sheltair Aviation Services

Aviation schools
 Dare to Dream Aviation - training pilots and instructors since 2001
 Orange Wings Aviation Academy
 Florida Aviation Academy
 Learn to Fly Center
 American Flyers
 Tailwheel Academy

Charter services
 Skymax

References

External links
 Pompano Beach Airpark

 
 

1940s establishments in Florida
Airports in Florida
Airports in Broward County, Florida
Buildings and structures in Pompano Beach, Florida
Military in Florida
United States Naval Outlying Landing Fields
Closed installations of the United States Navy